The 1983 Camus Hong Kong Masters was a professional non-ranking snooker tournament that took place between 5 and 7 August 1983 at the Queen Elizabeth Stadium in Hong Kong.

Doug Mountjoy won the tournament, defeating Terry Griffiths 4–3 in the final.

Main draw

References

Hong Kong Masters
1983 in snooker
1983 in Hong Kong sport